The Italian Catholic Church, or Catholic Church in Italy, is part of the worldwide Catholic Church in communion with the Pope in Rome, under the Conference of Italian Bishops. The pope serves also as Primate of Italy and Bishop of Rome. In addition to Italy, two other sovereign nations are included in Italian-based dioceses: San Marino and the Vatican City. There are 225 dioceses in the Catholic Church in Italy, see further in this article and in the article List of Catholic dioceses in Italy. 

The pope resides in the Vatican City, enclaved in Rome. Having been a major center for Christian pilgrimage since the Roman Empire, Rome is commonly regarded as the "home" of the Catholic Church, since it is where Saint Peter settled, ministered, served as bishop, and died. His relics are located in Rome along with Saint Paul's, among many other saints of Early Christianity.

Owing to the Italian Renaissance, church art in Italy is extraordinary, including works by Leonardo da Vinci, Michelangelo, Fra Carnevale, Gian Lorenzo Bernini, Sandro Botticelli, Tintoretto, Titian, Raphael, and Giotto, etc.

Italian church architecture is equally spectacular and historically important to Western culture, notably St. Peter's Basilica in Rome, Cathedral of St. Mark's in Venice, and Brunelleschi's Florence Cathedral, which includes the "Gates of Paradise" doors at the Baptistery by Lorenzo Ghiberti.

The status of the Catholic Church as the sole official religion in Italy ended in 1985, with the renegotiation of the Lateran Treaty.

History

Christianity arrived on the Italian peninsula in the first century, probably by unknown travelers, traders or soldiers. The Letter to the Romans of Paul the Apostle is addressed and attests to the presence of Roman Christians in the first century. Christians in Rome were also in touch with St. Peter and St. Paul the Apostle, both of whom went to Rome on mission and were eventually martyred there. One of the first Italian bishops and popes was Clement of Rome who wrote a letter to the Christian community in Corinth (1 Clement) around AD 96.

Over its two thousand-year history, the Church of Italy grew in size and influence producing and harboring (sometimes before martyrdom) some of the greatest leaders and movers of Catholic Christianity including Priscilla and Aquila; Ignatius of Antioch, martyred in Rome; Polycarp, martyred in Rome and a disciple of John the Evangelist; Agnes, Roman martyr; Lawrence, martyr; Justin Martyr, teacher and martyr; Hippolytus, priest and martyr; Cecilia, Roman martyr; Ambrose of Milan, bishop and Doctor of the Church; Jerome, theologian and Doctor of the Church; Benedict of Nursia, founder of the Benedictine order and of Western monasticism; Leo the Great, bishop of Rome and Doctor of the Church; Gregory the Great, bishop of Rome and Doctor of the Church; Augustine of Canterbury, Roman monk, Benedictine missionary to England, later English bishop; Urban II, pope or Bishop of Rome who called for the First Crusade; Anselm of Canterbury, Italian-born philosopher, Doctor of the Church and later English bishop; Francis of Assisi, mystic and founder of the Franciscans; Bonaventure of Bagnorea, Franciscan theologian and Doctor of the Church; Thomas Aquinas, Dominican theologian, philosopher, and Doctor of the Church; Dante, poet; Catherine of Siena, mystic, reformer, and Doctor of the Church; Monteverdi, composer; Robert Bellarmine of Tuscany, Jesuit theologian and Doctor of the Church; Antonio Vivaldi, priest and composer; Leo XIII, bishop of Rome and social reformer; Pius XII, bishop of Rome; John XXIII, bishop of Rome and initiator of Second Vatican Council, among many others. One could add to this list the founders of various contemporary lay ecclesial movements, notably Luigi Giussani, founder of Communion And Liberation, and Chiara Lubich, founder of the Focolare Movement. Also, Andrea Riccardi, founder of the Community of Sant'Egidio, now one of the great faith based organizations in the world.

Today
Approximately 74% of the Italian population identifies as Catholic. Italy has 225 dioceses and archdioceses, more than any other country in the world with the exception of Brazil. It also has the largest number of parishes (25,694), female (102,089) and male (23,719) religious, and priests (44,906 including secular (i.e. diocesan) and religious (those belonging to a male religious institute)).

The bishops in Italy make up the Conferenza Episcopale Italiana as a collaborative body to perform certain functions specified by Canon Law. Unlike most episcopal conferences, the president of the Italian conference is appointed by the pope, in his capacity as Primate of Italy. Since May 2022, the president of the episcopal conference has been Cardinal Matteo Maria Zuppi.

Organization

The Primate of Italy is the Bishop of Rome, who is also ex officio Pope of the Catholic Church. The Apostolic Nuncio to Italy is also the nuncio to San Marino; the incumbent is Italian Archbishop Giuseppe Bertello, who has held the office since January 2007.

There are two Catholic particular churches in Italy:
 The Latin Church (absolute majority, uses Roman rite except in the Archdiocese of Milan where Ambrosian rite is used).
 The very small Italo-Albanian Catholic Church (one of Eastern Catholic Churches, uses Byzantine rite) divided into Territorial Abbacy of Saint Mary of Grottaferrata, Eparchy of Lungro and Eparchy of Piana degli Albanesi.

The Latin Church in Italy is organized into:
 16 ecclesiastical regions (corresponding to the regions of Italy, with some consolidations).
 42 ecclesiastical provinces divided into:
 1 apostolic see (Diocese of Rome).
 1 patriarchal see (Patriarchate of Venice).
 40 metropolitan archdioceses.
 20 archdioceses.
 155 dioceses (see: List of Catholic dioceses in Italy).
 2 territorial prelatures: Territorial Prelature of Loreto and Territorial Prelature of Pompei.
 6 territorial abbeys: Monte Oliveto Maggiore, Montecassino, Montevergine, Santa Maria di Grottaferrata, La Trinità della Cava and Subiaco.
 1 military ordinariate: Military Ordinariate in Italy.

Catholic lay organizations 
 Azione Cattolica (organization of the Catholic Action in Italy)
 Forum Oratori Italiani (umbrella of Catholic youth organizations and youth ministry)

See also
List of Catholic dioceses in Italy

References

Further reading
 Allum, Percy. “Uniformity Undone: Aspects of Catholic Culture in Postwar Italy,” in Zygmunt Guido Baranski, Robert Lumley, eds. Culture and Conflict in Postwar Italy: Essays on Mass and Popular Culture (1990) pp. 79–96.
 Allum, Percy. "From Two into One' The Faces of the Italian Christian Democratic Party." Party Politics 3.1 (1997): 23–52.
 Binchy, Daniel A. Church and State in Fascist Italy (Oxford UP 1941) 774pp
 Ignazi, Piero, and Spencer Wellhofer. "Territory, religion, and vote: nationalization of politics and the Catholic party in Italy." Italian Political Science Review/Rivista Italiana di Scienza Politica 47.1 (2017): 21–43.
 Latourette, Kenneth Scott. Christianity in a Revolutionary Age, IV: The Twentieth Century in Europe: The Roman Catholic, Protestant, and Eastern Churches. (1958) pp 153–58.
 Pollard, John. Catholicism in Modern Italy: Religion, Society and Politics, 1861 to the Present (Routledge, 2008). a major scholarly history
 Pollard, John. "Pius XI's Promotion of the Italian Model of Catholic Action in the World-Wide Church." Journal of Ecclesiastical History 63.4 (2012): 758–784.
 Warner, Carolyn M. "Christian Democracy in Italy: An alternative path to religious party moderation." Party Politics 19.2 (2013): 256–276.

 
Italy
Catholicism in Italy
Italian culture